Henry Barrows may refer to:

 Henry A. Barrows (1875–1945), American actor
 Henry Dwight Barrows (1825–1914), American teacher, businessman, farmer, goldminer, reporter

See also 
 Henry Barrowe (c. 1550–1593), English Puritan